Lieutenant General Ronald Lee Burgess Jr., United States Army (born September 16, 1952) is a retired United States Army lieutenant general. His last military assignment was as the 17th director of the Defense Intelligence Agency and commander of the Joint Functional Component Command for Intelligence, Surveillance and Reconnaissance (JFCC-ISR). Prior to that, he was Director of the Intelligence Staff in the Office of the Director of National Intelligence.

From August 2005 to May 2007 he was the deputy director of National Intelligence for customer outcomes (requirements).

On May 17, 2007, the Office of the Director of National Intelligence announced that Burgess had been nominated to be the director of the Intelligence Staff (DIS) for the Office of the DNI. While the DIS position does not require Senate confirmation, it does require the Senate Armed Services Committee to confirm Burgess' 3-star rank as the DIS.

After the resignation of Gen. Michael Hayden as principal deputy director of National Intelligence, Burgess was selected by President George W. Bush in June 2006 to fill the position in an acting capacity until October 2007. During this time, he was still serving at the deputy director of national intelligence for customer outcomes (requirements) and transitioned to the director of the Intelligence Staff.  He served as the acting principal deputy director of national intelligence for a second time from January 2009 to February 2009.

Biography and education
Burgess was commissioned in military intelligence through the Reserve Officers' Training Corps in 1974. He graduated from high school in Opelika, Alabama, then earned a Bachelor of Arts degree in political science from Auburn University in 1974, a Master of Science degree in education from the University of Southern California in 1980, and a Master of Military Arts and Science from the U.S. Army Command and General Staff College in 1986. While attending Auburn University he was a brother in the Beta Zeta chapter of Theta Xi and served as the chapter president from 1973 to 1974.

His military education includes the Armor Officer Basic Course, the Military Intelligence Officers Advanced Course, the Command and General Staff College, the Advanced Military Studies Program, and the Air War College.

On May 16, 2015, Burgess was awarded the degree of Doctor of Laws, Honoris Causa, from LaGrange College in LaGrange, Georgia.

In June 2015, Burgess was inducted into the United States Army Military Intelligence Hall of Fame.

On Saturday, May 13, 2017, Burgess received an honorary Doctor of Laws (LL.D.) from Stetson University College of Law in Gulfport, Florida.

Military assignments
Staff assignments include: assistant executive officer to the deputy chief of staff for intelligence, Washington, D.C. in 1990; G-2, 25th Infantry Division (Light) from May 1993 to May 1994 at Schofield Barracks, Hawaii. He served as director of intelligence, J-2, Joint Special Operations Command (JSOC), Fort Bragg, North Carolina, from May 1997 to June 1999; director of intelligence, J-2, U.S. Southern Command from June 1999 until May 2003, and director for intelligence, J-2, the Joint Staff from June 2003 to July 2005. Burgess assumed duty as the deputy director of national intelligence for customer outcomes in August 2005 transitioning to director of the Intelligence Staff in February 2007. He was dual-hatted twice as the acting principal deputy director of national intelligence from May 2006 to October 2007, and January to February 2009.

Command assignments include: company commander, 124th Military Intelligence Battalion, 24th Infantry Division (Mechanized) at Fort Stewart, Georgia; command of the 125th Military Intelligence Battalion, 25th Infantry Division (Light), Schofield Barracks, Hawaii, from April 1991 to May 1993; and command of the 470th Military Intelligence Brigade in Panama from June 1995 to May 1997. LTG Burgess became the 17th director of the Defense Intelligence Agency on 18 March 2009.

Retirement and post-retirement
Burgess departed DIA on July 24, 2012, and officially retired from the US Army on September 1, 2012. Army Lieutenant General Michael T. Flynn, who had served as an assistant director of national intelligence, relieved Burgess.

At the change of command ceremony, Burgess received the National Intelligence Distinguished Service Medal from Director of National Intelligence (DNI) James R. Clapper, Jr. Burgess also received the Defense Distinguished Service Medal 1OLC for his service as the DIA director.

In December 2012, Burgess joined Auburn University as senior counsel for national security programs, cyber programs and military affairs.  In this capacity he works across the university to interface and coordinate with federal, state and commercial entities on all matters related to these areas.

In June 2015, Burgess was inducted into the United States Army Military Intelligence Hall of Fame

On November 9, 2016, Reuters reported that Burgess is part of the Trump transition team "focused on intelligence and security matters".

On Saturday, May 13, 2017, Burgess received an honorary Doctor of Laws (LL.D.) from Stetson University College of Law in Gulfport, Florida.

On 1 May 2018 Burgess assumed the duties of chief operating officer for Auburn University.  In this role he advises the president of the university on all matters related to the overall direction, management, and effective administrative operations of managed oversight in support of its mission, strategic plan, core values and vision.  In June, 2019 Burgess assumed the role of executive vice president of Auburn University with no real change in job function.

On Friday, July 27, 2018, Burgess was awarded an honorary Doctor of Strategic Intelligence, Honoris Causa, from the National Intelligence University in Bethesda, Maryland to recognize his longstanding and lasting contributions to the United States Intelligence Community (IC).

Personal life
Burgess and his wife Marta have five children: Lee, Regina, Julia, Mary, and John and sixteen grandchildren.

Awards and decorations

During his career LTG Burgess was recognized with awards by the governments of Colombia, Bolivia and Bulgaria.  Additionally, he was awarded the Order of the Star of Romania by the President of Romania, and was inducted into the Legion of Honour after selection by the President of France.

LTG Burgess is a recipient of the Auburn Alumni Association's Lifetime Achievement Award (2012).  In June 2016 LTG Burgess was inducted into the inaugural class of the United States Army Reserve Officers' Training Corps National Hall of Fame.

References

External links
DIA biography

|-

1952 births
Living people
Auburn University alumni
Directors of the Defense Intelligence Agency
Military personnel from North Carolina
Military intelligence
People from Jacksonville, North Carolina
Recipients of the Defense Distinguished Service Medal
Recipients of the Defense Superior Service Medal
Recipients of the Legion of Merit
United States Army Command and General Staff College alumni
United States Army generals
United States Deputy Directors of National Intelligence
USC Rossier School of Education alumni
Commanders of the Order of the Star of Romania